Antaeotricha hyalophanta is a moth in the family Depressariidae. It was described by Edward Meyrick in 1932. It is found in Peru.

References

Moths described in 1932
hyalophanta
Moths of South America
Taxa named by Edward Meyrick